Pulilu was a Prehispanic polity centered at Polillo, Quezon and was mentioned in the Chinese Gazeteer Zhufan zhi 諸蕃志 (1225). It is described as politically connected to the nation of Sandao "三嶋" at the Calamianes which itself was a vassal-state to the larger country of Ma-i "麻逸" centered in Mindoro. Its' people were recorded to be warlike, and prone to pillaging and conflict. In this area, the sea is full of coral reefs, which have wavy surfaces that resemble decaying tree trunks or razor blades. Ships going by the reefs must be ready to make sharp maneuvers to avoid them because they are sharper than swords and halberds. Red coral and blue langgan coral are also produced here, however they are quite difficult to find. It is also similar to the nation of Sandao in local customs and trade products. The chief export of this small polity are rare corals.

References

Former countries
Former countries in Philippine history
History of Luzon
History of the Philippines (900–1565)